Ropley is a village and large civil parish in the East Hampshire district of Hampshire, England. It lies within the diocese of Winchester.

The St Swithun's Way, part of the Pilgrims' Way from Winchester to Canterbury, passes through the village.

It is distinguished by its general absence of pavements in favour of boundary walls, hedges and mature trees. Ropley holds an annual Boxing Day walk, and a pram race on the spring bank holiday in May.

Etymology
Ropley is first recorded in AD 1167 as Ropeleia the name is derived from the Old English personal name  'Hroppa'   similar to modern day Robert and the common suffix 'léah' meaning either; meadow, small woodland or woodland clearing. The latter translation is most likely, this is because the personal name would specify a settlement in a woodland clearing, hence Ropley is translateable as  "Robert's woodland clearing" . The proposed reconstruction of the original Saxon writing would be something like *Hroppanleah.

This is also leads us to the etymology of the Hamlet of Lyeway about 2.25 km away. Lyeway first recorded in 1327 in the personal name John atte Ligheweye the name refers to a 'way' ie a lane that led to the 'léah', in other words Lyeway translates as the 'lane to Ropley'.

History
In the Domesday Book Ropley was part of the "Hundred of Bishops Sutton" (or "Ashley"). Ropley is noted as having provided the honey for William the Conqueror's mead.

The Gervais family
By the 13th century much of the manor of Ropley was owned by the Gervase family (also written as Gervais, Gervas, Gervase, Gerveis and Jervays), the name is of French/Norman origin and likely related to the other families who held lands throughout the country see also Walter Gervais. In the 1370s the family began to gift lands in Ropley to the founding of Winchester College by William of Wykeham. William Gervas of Ropley mentioned in Winchester College documents in 1256 is the first record of a Gervais family member in Ropley although their presence in the village likely went back earlier. The last mention of the family is in 1450  speaking about rentals of the Land of Roger Gervays. This being the last record is no surprise seeing they had given most of their lands to Winchester College by that point.

Inclosures Act
The commons and common fields of Ropley, estimated at 500 acres, were enclosed in 1709 in what was the first private parliamentary act of its kind in England. The bill was led by the bishop of Winchester, Jonathan Trelawny, in an effort to restore his family finances, and by the College of Winchester. The enclosure was strongly contested by petition by many of the commoners who claimed that the bishop and his three appointed commissioners were stealing their commons rights. Parliament declined to intervene. Serious and bloody repercussions followed affecting neighbouring parishes and later enclosures across the country.

The post office was opened in 1851 when the population was 818. In 1870, the population was 796

Parish church

St Peter's parish church lies in the village. Its World War I memorial lists 40 people who died, whilst the World War II tablet lists a further 10 people. The Grade-II listed church was severely damaged by a major electrical fire on 19 June 2014 which gutted the building and destroyed the roof. However plans have been put forward to repair the building.

The vicar of Ropley from 1796 to 1811 was the Reverend William Howley (who succeeded his father, also William Howley, in the post). Howley is perhaps Ropley's most famous resident, and went on to serve as a Canon of Christ Church, Regius Professor of Divinity at Oxford University, Bishop of London (1813-1828), and Archbishop of Canterbury (1828-1848), in which capacity he crowned two British monarchs.

Historic buildings

There are numerous old buildings in the village:

Hamlets
Ropley contains many interesting and ancient Hamlets that were part or currently are part of the historical area of Ropley Parish:

Education
The village contains one primary school, Ropley CofE Primary School, founded in 1826 by the Reverend Samuel Maddock, who first built it on a previous site in Petersfield Road. William Faichen was the co-founder of the school, and became the first Headmaster.

There was already another school in the area, located in present-day Four Marks (originally called 'Ropley Street'). Maddock thought that it was too much of a struggle for young children to walk a long distance every day, so he built his school in the centre of the village. The older school was demolished in the mid 1800s.

In 1869, the school burned down in a fire. It was rebuilt on the present day site at Church Street and reopened the same year. Since then, the school has operated continuously.

The school values its historic links with the community. Parts of the original Victorian traditional flint and brick buildings remain, and now form the hall and the school kitchen. The main teaching area consists of six modern classrooms with shared corridor working spaces. The most recent classroom was built in 2001 and is especially equipped for early years children. The primary school is one of the feeder schools for Perins School, and both maintain high standards.

Governance
Ropley is part of the Alton Rural county ward, and returns one county councillor to Hampshire County Council.

Ropley is part of the Ropley and Tisted district ward, and returns one district councillor to East Hampshire District Council.

Station

Ropley railway station opened in 1865, and has operated continuously since that date, other than for four years from 1973 to 1977. Originally opened by the London and South Western Railway, services ended in 1973, but were restored by a preservation society four years later, as part of the Mid Hants Railway, running heritage services between Alton and New Alresford. There is a 100-year established garden topiary by the station house side.  The locomotive shed and engineering works are located adjacent to the station, and tours may be booked. Trains operate from May to September each year, with additional Christmas and New Year special services.

Notable people
 
Thomas Taylor (1753–1806), cricketer who played for the Hambledon Club, made 105 first-class appearances from 1775 to 1798.
William Howley (1766–1848), clergyman in the Church of England, Archbishop of Canterbury from 1828 to 1848.
Samuel Rawson Gardiner (1829–1902), an English historian.
Peter Eade (1919–1979), theatrical agent 
Richard Holmes CBE, TD, JP, VR (1946–2011), a British military historian.
Brian Timms (born 1940), a former English first-class cricketer who played 232 matches

Further reading
 Hagen, Marianna S., Annals of Old Ropley (1929) 
 Hampshire County Council, Ropley at the Millennium, A Village Appraisal (2000)
 Heal, Chris, The Four Marks Murders, second edition, Chapters 2 & 4 (Chattaway and Spottiswood, Milverton, 2021) 
 Heal, Chris, Ropley's Legacy, The Ridge Enclosures, 1709 to 1850: Chawton, Farringdon, Medstead, Newton Valence and Ropley and the birth of Four Marks (Chattaway and Spottiswood, Four Marks 2021) 
 Hogarth, Peter, ‘Ropley in the Age of Smuggling’, No. 84 (Alresford Historical & Literary Society 1993)
 Kirby, T. F., The Charters of the Manor of Ropley, Hants (The Society of Antiquaries, London 1902)
 Mason, Frederick, Ropley Past and Present, A Brief Story of a Hampshire Village (Scriptmate Editions, London 1989)  (Hardback) 0-951-4647-1-X (paperback)
 Montgomery, Roy, The village of Ropley and the parish of St Peter (Hampshire Genealogical Society, Village Booklet No 20)
 Victoria County History, A History of the County of Hampshire: Volume 3, Ropley (British History Online 1908)

References

External links

Annals of St Peter's Church
 Stained Glass Windows at St. Peter, Ropley, Hampshire

Villages in Hampshire